The Abraham River (Nahr Ibrahim) also known as Adonis River, is a small river in the Keserwan-Jbeil Governorate in Lebanon, with a length of about . It passes through the town of Nahr Ibrahim before emptying into the Mediterranean Sea. The city takes its name from the river (nahr means river in Arabic).

The ancient city of Byblos stood near its outlet and was a site for the veneration of Adonis, the god of love, rebirth, and beauty in Phoenician Mythology. He was said to have been killed near the river by a boar sent by Ares, the god of war (or by Ares himself disguised as a boar, depending on the version). According to the myth, Adonis's blood flowed in the river, making the water reddish for centuries and spawning a carpet of scarlet buttercups along the river's banks. Indeed, the river flows red each February due to the volume of soil washed off the mountains by heavy winter rains, making it appear that the water is filled with blood

Due to the river's mythological connections, it was revered in ancient times and its valley contains the remains of numerous temples and shrines. Even today, local people hang out clothes of sick people at a ruined temple near the river's source hoping to effect cures.

See also
Abraham of Cyrrhus
Apheca
Adonis

References

External links
https://web.archive.org/web/20110929043744/http://www.ikamalebanon.com/eco_tourism/mount_et/mount_cities_et/nahribrahim.htm

Rivers of Lebanon
Hellenistic religion
Tourism in Lebanon